Imre Dögei (23 June 1912 – 16 January 1964) was a Hungarian Communist politician, who served as Speaker of the National Assembly of Hungary between 1951 and 1952 and as Minister of Agriculture from 1956 to 1960.

He joined to the Hungarian Communist Party (MKP) in 1944.

References
 Magyar Életrajzi Lexikon	

1912 births
1964 deaths
People from Törökszentmiklós
People from the Kingdom of Hungary
Hungarian Communist Party politicians
Members of the Hungarian Working People's Party
Members of the Hungarian Socialist Workers' Party
Agriculture ministers of Hungary
Speakers of the National Assembly of Hungary
Members of the National Assembly of Hungary (1947–1949)
Members of the National Assembly of Hungary (1949–1953)
Members of the National Assembly of Hungary (1953–1958)
Members of the National Assembly of Hungary (1958–1963)